The 2018 IPSC Action Air World Shoot I was the first IPSC Action Air World Shoot, and was held in Hong Kong indoor at the Kowloonbay International Trade & Exhibition Centre (KITEC). The match consisted of 30 stages over 3 days and had a match capacity of 600 competitors.

Champions

Open 
The Open division had the second largest match participation with 175 out of 481 starting competitors (36.4 %).

Individual

Teams Open

Standard 
The Standard division had the largest match participation with 213 out of 481 starting competitors (44.3 %).

Individual

Teams Standard

Production 
The Production division had the third largest match participation with 60 out of 481 starting competitors (12.5 %).

Individual

Teams Production

Classic 
The Classic division had the fourth largest match participation with 33 out of 481 starting competitors (7 %).

Individual

Teams Classic

See also 
IPSC Action Air World Shoot
IPSC Handgun World Shoots
IPSC Rifle World Shoots
IPSC Shotgun World Shoot

References

External links 
 Match Page: 2018 IPSC Action Air World Shooting Championship 
 Video: 2018 IPSC Action Air World Shooting Championship Recap
 Video: The World's First IPSC Action Air World Shoot Recap - RedWolf Airsoft RWTV

2018
International sports competitions hosted by Hong Kong
IPSC Action Air World Shoot
IPSC Action Air World Shoot
IPSC Action Air World Shoot